Mikhail Viktorovich Sukhov (born 4 June 1984) is a former Russian football player.

He represented Russia at the 2001 UEFA European Under-16 Championship.

External links
 

1984 births
Living people
Russian footballers
Association football defenders
FC Shakhter Karagandy players
FC Spartak Semey players
FC Zhenis Astana players
PFC Krylia Sovetov Samara players
Kazakhstan Premier League players
Russian expatriate footballers
Expatriate footballers in Kazakhstan